The following is a list of MTV Asia Awards winners for Favorite Artist Singapore.

MTV Asia Awards